Edward Robert "Ted" Wood (born January 4, 1967) is an American former professional baseball player. An outfielder, Wood played in Major League Baseball for the San Francisco Giants and Montreal Expos from 1991 to 1993. He also played in the Chinese Professional Baseball League for the Brother Elephants from 1997 to 1999, and in the Korea Baseball Organization for the Lotte Giants in 2000.

External links

Career statistics and player information from Korea Baseball Organization

1967 births
Living people
All-American college baseball players
American expatriate baseball players in Canada
American expatriate baseball players in Mexico
American expatriate baseball players in South Korea
American expatriate baseball players in Taiwan
Baseball players at the 1988 Summer Olympics
Baseball players from Ohio
Brother Elephants players
KBO League outfielders
Lotte Giants players
Major League Baseball outfielders
Medalists at the 1988 Summer Olympics
Montreal Expos players
New Orleans Privateers baseball players
Olympic gold medalists for the United States in baseball
Ottawa Lynx players
Pan American Games medalists in baseball
Pan American Games silver medalists for the United States
Phoenix Firebirds players
Rieleros de Aguascalientes players
San Francisco Giants players
Shreveport Captains players
Sportspeople from Mansfield, Ohio
Baseball players at the 1987 Pan American Games
Medalists at the 1987 Pan American Games